Boys Will Be Boys may refer to:

In film and television
 Boys Will Be Boys (1921 film), a 1921 American comedy film
 Boys Will Be Boys (1935 film), a 1935 British comedy film with Will Hay
 Boys Will Be Boys (TV series), name of the revamped American television sitcom Second Chance
 "Boys Will Be Boys", a 1994 episode of ABC Afterschool Special, an American TV series for children

In literature
 Boys Will Be Boys, a 1943 book about boys' weeklies by E. S. Turner
 Boys Will Be Boys, a 1963 book by Simon Raven
 Boys Will Be Boys, a 2003 biography of Z. A. Suleri by his daughter Sara Suleri Goodyear
 Boys Will Be Boys, a 2008 book on the Dallas Cowboys by Jeff Pearlman
 Boys Will Be Boys, a short story by Ruskin Bond
 Boys Will Be Boys, a 2018 book by Clementine Ford

In music

Artists/Groups

Boys Will Be Boys (Tiësto, Angger Dimas and Showtek)

Albums
 Boys Will Be Boys (Gary Glitter album), 1984
 Boys Will Be Boys!, a 1975 album by Rabbitt
 Boys Will Be Boyz, a 1991 album by Newsboys

Songs
 "Boys Will Be Boys" (Dua Lipa song), 2020
 "Boys Will Be Boys" (The Hooters song), 1993
 "Boys Will Be Boys" (The Ordinary Boys song), 2005
 "Boys Will Be Boys" (Paulina Rubio song), 2012
 "Boys Will Be Boys", a song by Backstreet Boys from their 1996 album Backstreet Boys
 "Boys Will Be Boys", a song by Danger Danger from their 1989 album Danger Danger
 "Boys Will Be Boys", a song by the Gear Daddies from their 1988 album Let's Go Scare Al
 "Boys Will Be Boys", a 2016 song by Miss Benny
 "Boys Will Be Boys", a song by Rock Goddess from their 1987 album Young and Free
 "Boys Will Be Boys", a song by Maureen Steele from her 1985 album Nature of the Beast
 "Boys Will Be Boys", a song by Stella Donnelly from her 2017 EP Thrush Metal and her 2019 album Beware of the Dogs